Gravel Switch is an area along the Paducah & Louisville Railway (PAL) between the Kentucky Dam on the Tennessee River and Grand Rivers in Livingston County, Kentucky, United States near the interchange of U.S. Route 62 and Kentucky Route 453. The gravel of the area was prized as one of the best cementing gravels for the construction of railroad track ballast. It remains a rail, barge, and transloading terminal for aggregates for Vulcan Materials Company's Grand Rivers Quarry.

History

In the early 1900s PAL's predecessor, the Illinois Central Railroad, had a spur line (its Kentucky Division) to this locale where rock was harvested for use as track ballast for the laying of track. Older maps (1936) show the spurs and surroundings.

After the Kentucky Dam was built and the Tennessee River basin filled (1955 maps), half of the Gravel Switch area and part of the rail line was submerged.

See also
Railroad switch
Siding (rail)

Notes

References

Illinois Central Railroad
Kentucky railroads
Mining in Kentucky